In taxonomy, Ahrensia is a genus of the Hyphomicrobiales. Ahrensia is named after the German microbiologist R. Ahrens. The cells are rod-shaped and motile. They are strictly aerobic.

See also
 List of bacterial genera named after personal names

References

Further reading

External links

Hyphomicrobiales
Bacteria genera